The 1884 Columbia football team was an American football team that represented Columbia University as an independent during the 1884 college football season. The team had no coach. Charles A. Stevens was the team captain.

Schedule

The win over the Polytechnic Institute is not officially recognized in Columbia's record book.

References

Columbia
Columbia Lions football seasons
Columbia football